Ralph Rokeby may refer to one of two men:

 Ralph Rokeby (died 1595), English lawyer and historian, father-in-law of Sir John Hotham, 1st Baronet
 Ralph Rokeby (died 1596), English barrister and judge

One of these two men was MP for Huntingdon in 1571, but it is not known which one.

See also
Rokeby (disambiguation)